The Cemetery of the Martyrs, Varrezat e Dëshmorëve, or sometimes Heroes' Cemetery, is a cemetery located above the city of Korca, Albania. The cemetery features a large statue of a soldier with a raised fist, as a memory for fallen soldiers who died during World War II in Albania. The statue is located on top of the Rruga Mbledhja e Beratit.

There is also the French Military Cemetery, Korçë, Varrezat franceze në Korçë.

References

External links
 

Buildings and structures in Korçë
Cemeteries in Albania
Albania in World War II
Military cemeteries
Tourist attractions in Korçë